La Rinconada Baseball Stadium (Spanish: Estadio de Béisbol de La Rinconada) also known as Monumental Stadium of Caracas Simón Bolívar  (Estadio Monumental de Caracas Simón Bolívar) is a modern baseball stadium in the city of Caracas, specifically in the sector of La Rinconada next to the Poliedro de Caracas, the Rinconada Racetrack and the future Venezuelan National Football Stadium in the so-called "Hugo Chávez " Park  in the Coche parish, south of the Libertador municipality and the Capital District and west of the metropolitan area of Caracas in Venezuela.

The stadium, with a seating capacity of 40,000 spectators, is the second largest in Latin America, after the Estadio Latinoamericano in Havana, Cuba

The new stadium, designed by Gensler, meets the highest world standards of its kind, and arises from the need to receive a larger number of spectators than the traditional University Stadium of the Central University of Venezuela (Estadio Universitario), which cannot be enlarged because it is part of the campus of the University City of Caracas, an architectural complex that was declared a World Heritage Site in 2000 by UNESCO

Inaugurated on February 02, 2023, by the President of Venezuela Nicolas Maduro, with the first meetings related to the 2023 Caribbean Series, in which the record of attendance at a championship game is broken with 35,691 fans during the meeting between Venezuela and Panama.

Name 
The stadium planned as early as 2013 was originally named "Comandante Hugo Chávez Stadium " after the late Venezuelan politician, but this generated controversy especially in sectors of the political opposition in Venezuela. However, in November 2022 the Venezuelan government announced that the stadium would tentatively be named "Estadio Isaías Látigo Chávez" in honor of the late Venezuelan baseball player.

The Caribbean Professional Baseball Confederation refers to the stadium, however, since the announcement of the competition in its official calendar simply as "Estadio La Rinconada " or "Estadio de Béisbol de La Rinconada " -to distinguish it from the soccer stadium projected next to it- due to the sector of the Coche parish where the structure is built, a name that is also used by several media outlets. Finally, a few days after its inauguration, the Venezuelan government adopted the official name of "Estadio Monumental de Caracas Simón Bolívar " in honor of the Venezuelan military, political and independence hero of the same name.

History 
For years, the possibility of building a new baseball stadium was evaluated due to the fact that the one located in Ciudad Universitaria had exceeded its capacity. In 2013 it was finally decided to approve a project as part of the Hugo Chávez Park in La Rinconada, a complex that also includes among others a Football stadium. That same year earthworks began very close to the Poliedro de Caracas.
The stadium was delayed due to economic difficulties but new resources were approved in 2015 and 2016. However, by 2021 it had not yet been completed.

In 2022 the government of the Mayor's Office of the Libertador Municipality announced new resources for its completion. The president of the Venezuelan Professional Baseball League, Giuseppe Palmisano said that although initially the 2023 Caribbean Series would be held only at the University Stadium of the UCV (San Pedro Parish, Caracas) and the Forum State of La Guaira (Macuto Parish) it is expected that the structure will be completed in November 2022 so that it can also host the event to be held in February 2023.

The stadium was finally approved to serve as one of the 2 venues for the Caribbean Series in February 2023. (the other venue is the La Guaira Forum Stadium)

Dimensions 
Dimensions of the playing field of the Monumental Stadium of Caracas Simón Bolívar are:

References 

Baseball venues in Venezuela
Sports venues completed in 2023
Estadio Universitario de Caracas
Sports venues in Caracas